Mundel is a surname. Notable people with the surname include:

Jennifer Mundel (born 1962), South African tennis player 
Luella Mundel (1913–2004), American art professor
Munna Lal Mundel, Indian naik

See also
Mandel
Munde (surname)
Mundell